Haiying may represent:

 Haiying spacesuit (海鹰号航天服) - a variant of the Orlan-M, see Orlan spacesuit
 Zhang Haiying, an artist
 Wei Haiying, a footballer
 HY-2 Haiying (海鹰) missile ("Sea Eagle" missile), see C-201 Silkworm missile
 China Haiying Electromechanical Technology Academy, manufacturer of the C-802 and C-701